Andreas Flocken (born 6 February 1845 in Albersweiler, Rheinpfalz; died 29 April 1913 in Coburg) was a German entrepreneur and inventor.

Life 
Until 1868 Flocken worked for German company Heinrich Lanz AG in Mannheim. Then he worked for company Schoppers in Zeulenroda. Since 1879, Flocken and his family lived in Coburg. In 1880, Flocken started his own company in Coburg.
The Flocken Elektrowagen of 1888 by German inventor Andreas Flocken is regarded as the first real electric car of the world.

Literature 
 Harald Linz, Halwart Schrader: Die Internationale Automobil-Enzyklopädie. United Soft Media Verlag GmbH, München 2008, 
 Halwart Schrader: Deutsche Autos 1885–1920. Motorbuch Verlag, Stuttgart,

See also 
 History of the electric vehicle

External links 
 Haag Engineering: Flocken Elektrowagen, Coburg

References 

19th-century German inventors
German electrical engineers
Businesspeople from Mannheim
People from Südliche Weinstraße
People from Coburg
1845 births
1913 deaths
German businesspeople in transport
Engineers from Rhineland-Palatinate